San Lucas Camotlán is a town and municipality in Oaxaca in south-western Mexico. The municipality covers an area of 127.58 km². 
It is part of the Sierra Mixe district within the Sierra Norte de Oaxaca Region.

As of 2005, the municipality had 518 households with a total population of 2,524 of whom 2,168 spoke an indigenous language.
About 90% of the population is engaged in agriculture, and 10% in animal husbandry.
The Union of Indigenous Communities of the Isthmus Region, a cooperative founded in 1982, assists in production and distribution of the local products, notably coffee, under a fair trade label.

References

Municipalities of Oaxaca